George Novack (August 5, 1905, Boston, Massachusetts – July 30, 1992, New York City) was an American Marxist theoretician, editor, and activist.

Biography

Novack attended Harvard University for five years, though without earning a degree, and was on a successful track in the publishing business when the beginning of the Great Depression radicalized him. He joined the Trotskyist movement (Communist League of America) in 1933, along with his first wife Elinor Rice, and was an elected member of the National Committee of the Socialist Workers Party (SWP) from 1940 to 1973.

In 1937-40, Novack served as the secretary of the American Committee for the Defence of Leon Trotsky. This body initiated the celebrated 1937 Dewey Commission that inquired into the charges made against Trotsky in the Moscow show trials, and found them to have been a complete frame-up. He played a major role in the defense campaign for the 18 SWP leaders imprisoned in World War II under the Smith Act.

Novack remained a member of the SWP until his death, although he withdrew from regular political activity after the death of his second wife, Evelyn Reed, in 1979, living quietly in a New York senior citizens' home.

Work

Novack produced a number of books on various aspects of Marxism. His work largely focused on presenting Marxist concepts in an accessible fashion, with major works on Dialectics, Historical materialism, and alienation. He also wrote a number of volumes explaining the intersections and differences between Marxism and other schools of Philosophy, including Analytic philosophy, Empiricism, Humanism, Existentialism, and Pragmatism.

Bibliography

External links

 George Novack Internet Archive. On line archive at Marxists Internet Archive.
 Bio-bibliographical sketch of George Novack at Marxists Internet Archive.
 Pathfinder Books, the bookstore of the Socialist Workers Party. Publisher of Novack's books.
 Novack, George. Radical Intellectuals in the 1930s. International Socialist Review Vol. 29, No. 2, March–April 1968, pp. 21–34. Text of speech to Socialist Scholars Conference, N. Y., Sept. 1967. Transcription/Editing: 2005 by Daniel Gaido.  HTML Markup: 2005 by David Walters.  Retrieved May 13, 2005.

1905 births
1992 deaths
Politicians from Boston
20th-century American Jews
Members of the Communist League of America
Members of the Workers Party of the United States
Members of the Socialist Party of America
Members of the Socialist Workers Party (United States)
Jewish socialists
Harvard University alumni
Marxist theorists
People convicted under the Smith Act